"A Fifth of Beethoven" is a disco instrumental recorded by Walter Murphy and the Big Apple Band, adapted from the first movement of Ludwig van Beethoven's Symphony No. 5. The record was produced by production music and sound effects recording producer Thomas J. Valentino. The "Fifth" in the song's title is a pun, referencing a liquid measure approximately equal to one-fifth of a gallon, a popular size for bottles containing liquor, as well as Beethoven's Fifth Symphony from which the song was adapted.

Released as a single by Private Stock Records in 1976, the song debuted at number 80 on the Billboard Hot 100 chart and climbed to number 1 within 19 weeks, remaining there for one week. In 1977, it was licensed to RSO Records for inclusion on the best-selling Saturday Night Fever soundtrack. The song is one of Murphy's few Top 40 hits.

Background and recording
In college, Murphy's interests included rock music, particularly that which was adapted from classical music, such as "Joy" by Apollo 100 and "A Lover's Concerto" by The Toys. Later, in 1976, while writing a disco song for a commercial, a producer suggested the idea of "updating classical music", which "nobody [has] done lately". He then recorded a demo tape of five songs—three were ordinary pop songs, while the fourth was a disco rendition of Beethoven's Fifth Symphony titled "A Fifth of Beethoven"—mailing it to various record labels in New York City.

The response was underwhelming, but "Fifth" caught the interest of Private Stock Records owner Larry Uttal. Murphy signed on to Private Stock and recorded the album A Fifth of Beethoven, containing the title track and first single of the same name. The single was credited to "Walter Murphy & The Big Apple Band" upon encouragement from Private Stock, which believed it would be more successful if credited to a group rather than an individual. However, two days following the record's release, Private Stock discovered the existence of another Big Apple Band (which promptly changed its name to Chic). The record was later re-released and credited to "The Walter Murphy Band", then simply to "Walter Murphy".

Reception
"A Fifth of Beethoven" started at number 80 on the Billboard Hot 100 and eventually reached number 1 within 19 weeks, where it stayed for one week. The single sold two million copies, while the album sold about 750,000 copies. The second single, a rendition of Nikolai Rimsky-Korsakov's "Flight of the Bumblebee", titled "Flight '76", reached number 44 on the Hot 100.

In addition to Saturday Night Fever, it appears in a heavily edited form in the movie House of Gucci. It is used as the theme of the TV miniseries Mrs. America.

In popular culture
The music was used in a recruitment campaign by the Irish Defence Forces in the early 1980s.

Charts and certifications

Weekly charts

Year-end charts

All-time charts

Certifications

See also
List of Billboard Hot 100 number-one singles of 1976
List of Cash Box Top 100 number-one singles of 1976
List of number-one singles of 1976 (Canada)

References

External links

1976 singles
1976 songs
1970s instrumentals
Billboard Hot 100 number-one singles
Cashbox number-one singles
RPM Top Singles number-one singles
Disco songs
Cultural depictions of Ludwig van Beethoven
Pop instrumentals
Private Stock Records singles
Songs from Saturday Night Fever
Songs written by Walter Murphy
Popular songs based on classical music